Asaf Ben-Muha (born August 4, 1985) is an Israeli professional football (soccer) player.

Footnotes

External links

Israeli footballers
Maccabi Netanya F.C. players
Hapoel Nof HaGalil F.C. players
Hapoel Bnei Lod F.C. players
Ironi Umm al-Fahm F.C. players
Hapoel Petah Tikva F.C. players
Maccabi Yavne F.C. players
Maccabi Daliyat al-Karmel F.C. players
Beitar Kfar Saba F.C. players
Israeli beach soccer players
Footballers from Hadera
Israeli Premier League players
Liga Leumit players
Association football central defenders
Israeli Jews
Israeli people of Moroccan-Jewish descent
1985 births
Living people